Wayne Maurice Caron (November 2, 1946 – July 28, 1968) was a United States Navy hospital corpsman who was killed in action while serving with a Marine Corps rifle company in the Vietnam War. For heroic actions above and beyond the call of duty on July 28, 1968, he was posthumously awarded the United States military's highest decoration for valor—the Medal of Honor.

Biography
Caron was born in Middleborough, Massachusetts. He graduated from Memorial High School in Middleborough in June 1966.

He joined the U.S. Navy on July 12, 1966, at Boston. He completed recruit training at the Great Lakes Naval Training Center and then Navy Hospital Corps School, at Great Lakes, Illinois. He also completed the Field Medical Service School at Camp Pendleton, California. On January 16, 1968, he was promoted to hospital corpsman third class.

On July 3, 1968, he was sent to and arrived in Vietnam. He was assigned to Headquarters and Service Company, 3rd Battalion, 7th Marine Regiment, 1st Marine Division (Reinforced). On July 28, he was killed in action during an intense firefight while serving as a platoon corpsman with K Company, 3rd Battalion, 7th Marines in Quảng Nam Province, South Vietnam. Before he was killed, he was wounded three separate times in the firefight by enemy fire while he moved to render aid to fallen Marines. The 3rd Battalion, 7th Marines lost 18 Marines besides Caron that day.

Caron, age 21, was buried in Arlington National Cemetery, Arlington County, Virginia.

On April 20, 1970, Caron's wife was presented Caron's Medal of Honor by Vice President Spiro Agnew during a ceremony at the White House.

Military awards

Caron's military awards and decorations include:

Medal of Honor citation

Caron's official Medal of Honor citation reads:

The President of the United States in the name of The Congress takes pride in presenting the MEDAL OF HONOR posthumously to

for service as set forth in the following

CITATION:

For conspicuous gallantry and intrepidity at the risk of his life above and beyond the call of duty while serving as platoon corpsman with Company K, during combat operations against enemy forces. While on a sweep through an open rice field HM3 Caron's unit started receiving enemy small arms fire. Upon seeing two Marine casualties fall, he immediately ran forward to render first aid, but found that they were dead. At this time, the platoon was taken under intense small-arms and automatic weapons fire, sustaining additional casualties. As he moved to the aid of his wounded comrades, HM3 Caron was hit in the arm by enemy fire. Although knocked to the ground, he regained his feet and continued to the injured Marines. He rendered medical assistance to the first Marine he reached, who was grievously wounded, and undoubtedly was instrumental in saving the man's life. HM3 Caron then ran toward the second wounded Marine, but was again hit by enemy fire, this time in the leg. Nonetheless, he crawled the remaining distance and provided medical aid for this severely wounded man. HM3 Caron started to make his way to yet another injured comrade, when he was again struck by enemy small-arms fire. Courageously and with unbelievable determination, HM3 Caron continued his attempt to reach the third Marine until he was killed by an enemy rocket round. His inspiring valor, steadfast determination and selfless dedication in the face of extreme danger, sustain and enhance the finest traditions of the U.S. Naval Service.

Honors and namings
In 1970, a plaque at the Chelsea Naval Hospital was placed in his honor.

The ship was named in honor of Wayne Caron.

On June 17, 1994, a Navy medical clinic at Camp Lejeune, North Carolina, was named after Caron. This was the first building named for a corpsman at Camp Lejeune; the Navy Hospital Corps was founded on June 17, 1898.

See also

 List of Medal of Honor recipients for the Vietnam War

References

External links
 Who's Who in Marine Corps History

1946 births
1968 deaths
American military personnel killed in the Vietnam War
Burials at Arlington National Cemetery
United States Navy Medal of Honor recipients
United States Navy corpsmen
People from Middleborough, Massachusetts
Vietnam War recipients of the Medal of Honor
United States Navy personnel of the Vietnam War